This table shows the list of all historical monuments classified or listed in the city of Bastia, Haute-Corse, Corsica.

See also
 List of historical monuments of Ajaccio
 Monument historique

References

 
Haute-Corse-related lists